El hijo del Cacique is a Colombian telenovela that premiered on Venezuelan broadcast channel Televen on 15 October 2019, and concluded on 11 February 2020. The telenovela is based on the life of the late Colombian singer Martín Elías, son of Diomedes Díaz. It stars Milciades Cantillo as the titular character.

Cast 
 Milciades Cantillo as Martín Elías
 Rafael Santos Díaz as himself
 Francesco Chedraui as Diomedes Díaz
 Lillyana Guihurt as Patricia Acosta
 Rafael Acosta as Luis Ángel Díaz
 Óscar Díaz as Diomedes de Jesús
 Eibar Gutiérrez as Elver Díaz
 Margoth Velásquez as Elvira Maestre "Mamá Vila"
 Carlos Andrés Villa as Romualdo (character inspired on Rolando Ochoa)
 Vivian Ossa as Tata (character inspired on Caya Varón)
 Valerie Domínguez as Chavita
 Jhon Mindiola as Silvestre Dangond

Background and legal problems 
The telenovela was initially be titled Martín Elías, el inmortal, but because the name and image of the singer belong to his two former ex-wives, and because the telenovela is not based solely on Martín's life, since a large part would star Rafael Santos, the brother of the singer, the title was modified to El hijo del Cacique. The telenovela story is based on the stories of the singer's brothers and mother and will take place in Valledupar and Bogotá.

References

External links 
 

Spanish-language telenovelas
Television series based on singers and musicians
Caracol Televisión telenovelas
Colombian telenovelas
Television shows set in Colombia
2019 Colombian television series debuts
2020 Colombian television series endings